Randt is a surname. Notable people with the surname include:

 Clark T. Randt Jr. (born 1945), American lawyer and diplomat
  (born 1983), German author
 Os du Randt (born 1972), South African rugby player
 Peter Randt (born 1941), German  handball player

See also 
 Du Randt